Baturino is a rural locality (a selo) in Pribaykalsky District, Republic of Buryatia, Russia. The population was 45 as of 2010. There are 4 streets.

Geography 
Baturino is located 25 km northeast of Turuntayevo (the district's administrative centre) by road. Nesterovo is the nearest rural locality.

References 

Rural localities in Okinsky District